William Walling (June 2, 1872 – March 5, 1932) was an American actor of the silent era. He appeared in 60 films between 1921 and 1932. He is known for his role as the railroad president in the 1926 film The Great K & A Train Robbery, which starred Tom Mix. He died in California, aged 59. He was married to actress Effie (Bond) Walling and was the father of actor and photographer Richard Walling AKA William Walling Jr.

Before he acted in films, Walling traveled the United States performing with stock theater companies.

Partial filmography

 The Killer (1921)
 The Little Minister (1921)
 North of the Rio Grande (1922)
 The Village Blacksmith (1922)
 While Satan Sleeps (1922)
 His Back Against the Wall (1922)
 The Ladder Jinx (1922)
 Nobody's Money (1923)
 North of Hudson Bay (1923)
 Nellie, the Beautiful Cloak Model (1924)
 The Iron Horse (1924)
 In Love with Love (1924)
 The Clash of the Wolves (1925)
 Ranger of the Big Pines (1925)
 The Timber Wolf (1925)
 His Master's Voice (1925)
 The Gentle Cyclone (1926)
 Sir Lumberjack (1926)
 Lost at Sea (1926)
 Womanpower (1926)
 The Great K & A Train Robbery (1926)
 The Canyon of Light (1926)
 The Devil's Partner (1926)
 Sin Cargo (1926)
 The Princess from Hoboken (1927)
 The Devil's Saddle (1927)
 The Harvester (1927)
 The King of Kings (1927)
 Now I'll Tell One (1927)
 The Noose (1928)
 Dark Streets (1929)
 Beyond the Law (1930)
 Range Feud (1931)
 Two Fisted Justice (1931)
 Riders of the North (1931)
 The Painted Desert (1931) as Kirby
 Ridin' for Justice (1932)
 High Speed (1932)

References

External links

1872 births
1932 deaths
Male actors from Iowa
American male film actors
American male silent film actors
20th-century American male actors